State Trunk Highway 17 (often called Highway 17, STH-17 or WIS 17) is a state highway in the U.S. state of Wisconsin. The highway is a secondary route in northeastern Wisconsin that directly connects Rhinelander, Eagle River and the central and eastern parts of Michigan's Upper Peninsula with Wausau, Wisconsin and points south and west.

Route description
WIS 17 begins at WIS 64, about a half mile east of WIS 64's interchange with US 51 near Merrill. From there, WIS 17 heads northeast, passing the Prairie Dells area and crossing several county routes in Bloomville and Gleason. The highway briefly crosses over out of Lincoln County into Langlade County, Wisconsin The highway then passes through Parrish and turns northwestward and returns to Lincoln County, briefly cutting through Oneida County in the process.

The two and a half mile concurrency is actually a "wrong-way" concurrency between WIS 17 North and WIS 47 south. WIS 17 turns north off the concurrency as the other two highways continue east. WIS 17 passes east of Rhinelander on an urban arterial then continues north, passing through Sugar Camp. WIS 17 then joins WIS 70 east, continuing into Eagle River. in the downtown area, WIS 17 leaves concurrency with WIS 70 and follows US 45 / WIS 32 north and out of the city. Four miles north, WIS 17 turns east off US 45/WIS 32 and heads northeast, entering the Nicolet National Forest and passing through Phelps. WIS 17 then heads east of Phelps, becoming Iron County Road 436 (Smokey Lake Road) upon entering Michigan. CR 436 meets Forest Highway 16 a short distance across the Michigan state line.

History
WIS 17 originally began at the Illinois state line and passed through Kenosha, Racine, and into Milwaukee via present day WIS 32 to Whitefish Bay, then along WIS 57 through Cedarburg, Grafton and Saukville (along what is now CTH O). The route in Milwaukee was realigned to run along Lake Michigan in 1920.  The route then headed north to Sheboygan and Manitowoc along present day WIS 42 and up the Lake Michigan Shoreline to Sturgeon Bay and Sister Bay.  The route's southern terminus became Manitowoc when US 141 debuted in 1926. The remainder was replaced with WIS 42 in 1932.

The portion the current WIS 17 between Merrill and Eagle River was previously WIS 63.  This route began at WIS 10 in Merrill and ended at WIS 70 west of Eagle River. The portion northeast of Eagle River was numbered as WIS 70. This route was removed in 1934 when U.S. Route 63 was opened into Wisconsin. The WIS 17 number was available at the time and applied to the route. The route was extended in 1947 when WIS 70 was changed to its current alignment. The southern terminus was relocated to its present location on WIS 64 in the late 1980s.

WIS 17 originally passed through Rhinelander. The route was rerouted along US 8/WIS 47 south of the city to reach the new bypass route. This alignment was removed from the state trunkline books when the new route was opened and is now a city street.

Major intersections

See also

References

External links

017
Transportation in Lincoln County, Wisconsin
Transportation in Langlade County, Wisconsin
Transportation in Oneida County, Wisconsin
Transportation in Vilas County, Wisconsin